Alexander Hay may refer to:

Alexander Hay (died 1594), Scottish politician
Alexander Hay (mayor) (1806–1882), mayor of Pittsburgh, 1842–1845
Alexander Hay (South Australian politician) (1820–1898), member of the South Australian Parliament
 Alexander Hay (songwriter) (1826–after 1891), Newcastle–born cabinet maker, songwriter and poet
Alexander Hay (Australian politician) (1865–1941), New Zealand-born member of the Australian House of Representatives
 Alexander Leith Hay (1758–1838), British army officer
Alex Hay (1933–2011), Scottish golfer